Lone Elder is an unincorporated community in Clackamas County, Oregon, United States.

References

Unincorporated communities in Clackamas County, Oregon
Unincorporated communities in Oregon